Hardcastle Crags is a wooded Pennine valley in West Yorkshire, England, owned by the National Trust.

Gibson Mill
Approximately half a mile along the valley there is a 19th-century cotton mill called Gibson Mill. The mill was water powered and has been renovated to demonstrate renewable energy sources and a sustainability strategy. The former cotton mill was one of the first powered mills built at the start of the Industrial Revolution.

Water powered turbines, photo voltaic panels, composting toilets, a wood-burning boiler, a wood-burning cocklestove and locally sourced reclaimed interior materials have gone into making the venture sustainable.

The mill, a grade II listed building, reopened to the public on Saturday, 24 September 2005, and there are exhibits about the mill and its workers.

Gallery

References

External links
Hardcastle Crags on the National Trust Website
Northern hairy wood ant at Hardcastle Crags - BBC

National Trust properties in West Yorkshire
Nature reserves in West Yorkshire
Tourist attractions in Calderdale